Jordan competed at the 2017 World Games held in Wrocław, Poland.

Medalists

Ju-jitsu 

Luma Hatem Sharif Alqubaj won the silver medal in the women's ne-waza open event.

Muay Thai 

Mohammad Salama competed in the men's 81 kg event.

References 

Nations at the 2017 World Games
2017 in Jordanian sport
Jordan at multi-sport events